William J. Duffy (October 29, 1916February 25, 2013) was an American lawyer, politician, and judge.  He retired in 1992 after 24 years as a Wisconsin Circuit Court Judge in Brown County.  Earlier in his career, he represented Brown County in the Wisconsin State Assembly as a Democrat.

Biography

Born in North Branch, Minnesota, Duffy grew up in Hollandtown, Wisconsin, and graduated from Kaukauna High School. He graduated from St. Norbert College and received his law degree from the University of Wisconsin Law School in 1941.  Later that year, he joined the United States Army Air Forces for service in World War II.  He served throughout the war in the Pacific theater, rising to the rank of Captain.

After the war, he practiced law in Green Bay, Wisconsin, in a partnership with attorney Jerry Clifford.  In 1948 he defeated incumbent Republican Assemblyman Harvey Larsen to serve in the Wisconsin State Assembly for the 1949-1950 session.  Larsen came back and defeated Duffy in 1950, ending his brief career in the Assembly.  Duffy returned to his legal practice.

In 1967, the Wisconsin Legislature created a third branch in the 14th judicial circuit.  Duffy ran unopposed in the special election for the new circuit court judgeship, and would remain on the circuit court in Brown County for the next 24 years, earning re-election in 1974, 1980, and 1986.  In 1982, he was selected as Chief Judge for the 8th Judicial Administrative District by the Wisconsin Supreme Court.  He served the maximum 3 two-year terms as Chief Judge.

Judge Duffy retired from the court in 1992, but continued to work as a reserve judge and remained an active member of the community in the city of Green Bay.  He served on the faculty of the University of Wisconsin–Green Bay from 1970 to 1975, teaching labor law, he was the first president of the Green Bay Voluntary Commission on Human Rights, and was a member of the Governor's Commission on Human Rights.

Personal life and family

In May 1950, Duffy married Elizabeth Boyden.  Judge Duffy died on February 25, 2013, in Green Bay, Wisconsin, at age 96.  His wife preceded him in death.  They were survived by five children and ten grandchildren.

Electoral history

Wisconsin Assembly (1948, 1950)

| colspan="6" style="text-align:center;background-color: #e9e9e9;"| General Election, November 2, 1948

| colspan="6" style="text-align:center;background-color: #e9e9e9;"| General Election, November 7, 1950

Wisconsin Circuit Court (1968, 1974, 1980, 1986)

| colspan="6" style="text-align:center;background-color: #e9e9e9;"| General Election, April 2, 1968

References

|-

|-

|-

1916 births
2013 deaths
People from North Branch, Minnesota
Politicians from Green Bay, Wisconsin
St. Norbert College alumni
University of Wisconsin Law School alumni
United States Army Air Forces officers
Wisconsin lawyers
Wisconsin state court judges
People from Holland, Brown County, Wisconsin
20th-century American judges
20th-century American lawyers
Military personnel from Wisconsin
Military personnel from Minnesota
Democratic Party members of the Wisconsin State Assembly